The Aba Saleh al-Mahdi Tunnel  is a highway tunnel in Asia running under the Zagros Mountains in the Eqlid, Fars Province of Iran.
This tunnel is one of the largest in Iran and the Middle East.
connects the district of Eqlid with the district of Chahar Dange.

The tunnel was in part built as an alternative route from Eqlid to the district of Chahar Dange, shortening the trip by about 20 minutes. By the order of Ayatollah Seyyed Mohammad Bagher Movahed Abtahi and the help of some religious people, they constructed this tunnel.

References

Road tunnels in Iran
Tunnels completed in 2013